The 2015–16 FIU Panthers men's basketball team represented Florida International University during the 2015–16 NCAA Division I men's basketball season. The Panthers, led by third year head coach Anthony Evans, played their home games at FIU Arena, and were members of Conference USA. They finished the season 13–19, 7–11 in C-USA play to finish in a three way tie for ninth place. They lost in the second round of the C-USA tournament to UTEP.

Previous season 
The Panthers finished the season 16–17, 8–10 in C-USA play in a 4 way tie for seventh place. They advanced to the quarterfinals of the C-USA tournament where they lost to UTEP.

Departures

Incoming Transfers

Recruiting class of 2015

Roster

Schedule

|-
!colspan=9 style="background:#; color:#;"| Non-conference regular season

|-
!colspan=12 style="background:#;| Conference USA regular season

|-
!colspan=9 style="background:#;| Conference USA tournament

References

FIU Panthers men's basketball seasons
Florida International
FIU Panthers men's b
FIU Panthers men's b